121st may refer to:

121st (Western Irish) Battalion, CEF, a unit in the Canadian Expeditionary Force during the First World War
121st Air Refueling Wing (121 ARW) is an aerial refueling organization assigned to the Ohio Air National Guard
121st Engineer Battalion, one of the first American units to land in Normandy on D-Day during World War II
121st Fighter Squadron flies the F-16C/D Fighting Falcon
121st Infantry Division (German Empire), a unit of the Imperial German Army in World War I
121st International Olympic Committee Session, 2009-10-02 in Denmark, when the 2016 Summer Olympics location will be decided
121st meridian east, 121° east of Greenwich, a line of longitude through Asia, the Indian Ocean and Australia
121st meridian west, 121° west of Greenwich, a line of longitude through North America and the Pacific Ocean
121st New York Volunteer Infantry Regiment, a volunteer regiment recruited during the American Civil War
121st Pennsylvania Regiment, a regiment of the Union Army during the United States Civil War
121st Regiment of Foot (1762), an infantry regiment of the British Army, formed in 1762 and disbanded in 1764
121st Regiment of Foot (1794), an infantry regiment of the British Army, formed in 1794 and disbanded in 1796
121st Signal Battalion (United States), a signal unit of the United States Army, inactivated as of July 2006
121st Street (BMT Jamaica Line), a station on the elevated BMT Jamaica Line of the New York City Subway
121st Street (IRT Second Avenue Line), a station on the demolished IRT Second Avenue Line
121st Weather Flight, a subordinate unit of the 113th Wing of the United States Air Force based at Andrews Air Force Base, Maryland